Kenneth Morgan may refer to:

 Kenneth Morgan (Shi'a), American religious leader, academic & author on Islam, see Shi'a Islam (book)
 Kenneth O. Morgan (born 1934), Welsh historian and author
 Kenneth W. Morgan (1908–2011), American scholar of religion